Roziya Boimatovna Ghafurova, better known as Roziya Ozod (January 18, 1893 – 1957), was a Tajikistani poet of the Soviet era.

Ozod was born in Khujand into the family of a merchant, and received her early education in the traditional schools before embarking on a career as a teacher. According to her own account of her biography as told through her poetry, she spent the entirety of her early life within the confines of Khujand, first in her family home and later in the house of her husband; she never even saw the outskirts of the city. It was only with the Russian Revolution that she first felt truly free, which was the reason she chose "Ozod" as her takhallus.  She began writing poetry during World War II, composing patriotic works in which she urged warriors to fight on for the motherland. She continued writing after the war; notable works include Qahramoni Odil (Just Champion, 1943), Mahabbat ba Vatan (Love for the Country, 1944), Gulistoni 'Ishq (The Rose Garden of Love, 1946), Az Vodihoi Taloi (From the Golden Valleys, 1948), Iqbol (Fortune, 1951), and Zindabod Sulh (Long Live Peace, 1954). The theme of many of these later poems is the lot of women, especially in the time before the Revolution. Other work is dedicated to children. In 1944 Ozod joined the Union of Writers of Tajikistan; she died in Khujand. She was the mother of scholar Bobojon Ghafurov. Stylistically her verse has a simplicity reminiscent of folk poetry, although it reflects classical models as well. A collected volume of poetry, Ash'ori muntakhab (Selected Poems), appeared posthumously in 1959.

References

1893 births
1957 deaths
Tajikistani women poets
20th-century Tajikistani poets
Soviet women poets
People from Khujand
20th-century Tajikistani writers 
20th-century Tajikistani women writers